The following are lists of Doctor Doctor episodes:

 List of Doctor Doctor (American TV series) episodes
 List of Doctor Doctor (Australian TV series) episodes

See also 
 Doctor Doctor (South Korean TV series)